Whitney Phillips is an American media studies scholar and author. She studies online misinformation.

She is assistant professor in the Department of Communication and Rhetorical Studies at Syracuse University.

Phillips received a BA in philosophy from Humboldt State University in 2004, a MFA in creative writing from Emerson College in 2007, and a PhD in English from the University of Oregon.

Books
This is Why We Can’t Have Nice Things: Mapping the Relationship between Online Trolling and Mainstream Culture (MIT, 2015)
with Ryan M. Milner The Ambivalent Internet: Mischief, Oddity, and Antagonism Online (Polity, 2017)
with Ryan M. Milner You Are Here: A Field Guide for Navigating Polarized Speech, Conspiracy Theories, and Our Polluted Media Landscape (MIT, 2021)

References

External links
Whitney Phillips at Wired

American women non-fiction writers
Year of birth missing (living people)
Living people
Place of birth missing (living people)
Syracuse University faculty
California State Polytechnic University, Humboldt alumni
Emerson College alumni
University of Oregon College of Arts and Sciences alumni